The Life of Riley is a 1927 American silent comedy film directed by William Beaudine. Distributed by First National, the film stars  Charles Murray in the title role, George Sidney, Stephen Carr, and June Marlowe. The Life of Riley is now presumed lost.

Cast
 Charles Murray as Timothy Riley (fire chief)
 George Sidney as Otto Meyer (police chief)
 Stephen Carr as Steve Meyer
 June Marlowe as Molly O'Rourke
 Myrtle Stedman as Penelope Jones
 Sam Hardy as Al Montague
 Bert Woodruff as Aaron Brown
 Edwards Davis as John King

References

External links

1927 films
1927 comedy films
1927 lost films
Silent American comedy films
American silent feature films
American black-and-white films
Films directed by William Beaudine
First National Pictures films
Lost American films
Lost comedy films
1920s American films